Doddakalahalli is a village in Malur taluk, Kolar district, Karnataka, India. It is part of the Rajenahalli Gram panchayat.  The name of the village is derived from the rocky landscape; "Dodda" meaning bigger, kallu meaning stone, and "Halli" meaning village.  The population of the village is 925.

References

External links
 Kolar District

Villages in Kolar district